Liam Bartlett (born 30 June 1961) is an Australian journalist and reporter, best known for his career in radio and television.

Career
Born in Perth, Western Australia, previously, Bartlett had a six-year stint with ABC radio station 720 ABC Perth, presenting the morning program. He had previously worked for STW 9 in Perth and GWN in Bunbury as a news anchor and reporter. He worked for a time at 3SR in Shepparton in Victoria and Triple M in Sydney. While working on Perth radio stations, he was also a columnist for the News Corporation newspaper The Sunday Times. He has appeared on television as host of The 7.30 Report in WA, ABC TV and the Nine Network Australia (GTV Melbourne) presenting both current affairs and news.

Bartlett was a delegate to the Australian Constitutional Convention 1998. He was an elected representative, contesting the poll as an independent candidate.

In 2002, Bartlett won a Churchill Fellowship to study investigative journalism. He spent three months in the United States and the United Kingdom.

In July 2006 he left Perth radio station 6PR following a move from rival station 720 ABC Perth to join 60 Minutes, where he would present until 2012, before leaving the media and accepting a role at Shell International's Creative Visual unit based in London.
He returned to the Nine Network and 60 Minutes from the 2015 season.

In 2021, Bartlett also returned to 6PR, now owned by Nine Entertainment, to host its morning program while juggling his ongoing role as a reporter on 60 Minutes.

In September 2022, Bartlett announced his resignation from 6PR and 60 Minutes, effective the following November.

Awards
During his career Bartlett has won three international and two national awards for reporting, including New York Festival awards for both TV and Radio and the Brigitte Bardot (Genesis) Award for TV. In addition he has been awarded four separate Australian Journalists Association awards for Western Australia for investigative reports and feature writing.

Personal life
Bartlett is married to Claire and they have three children.

References

External links
 Public speaking profile

Australian television presenters
Living people
60 Minutes (Australian TV program) correspondents
1961 births
Australian radio journalists
University of Western Australia alumni